Gakiling Gewog (Dzongkha: དགའ་སྐྱིད་གླིང་) is a gewog (village block) of Haa District, Bhutan.

References

Gewogs of Bhutan
Haa District